Nilam Farooq (born 26 September 1989) is a German actress. She has appeared in several television series, films, and commercials. She won the best actress Jupiter Award (2019) and the Bavarian Film Awards (2020) for movies Heilstätten and Contra.

Biography 
Nilam Farooq is the daughter of a Pakistani father and a Polish mother, and she has a younger brother. She was born in Berlin and grew up in the Wilmersdorf district, where she attended the local Goethe Gymnasium and completed her Abitur. Farooq displayed an early interest in acting and began her acting career at age 14. In addition to German, she is fluent in Polish and English, and has language credentials in Latin and Ancient Greek.

In 2006 Farooq had her first guest and supporting roles as an actress on television and short films. She started appearing in commercials in the late 2000s and since the beginning of the 2010s, took some roles as a voice actress.

From 2013 to 2019 Farooq was regularly seen in the television series Leipzig Homicide as Commissioner Olivia Fareedi.

She has since played roles in various TV films and series, for example in Tatort: Roomservice  or Polizeiruf 110: Grenzgänger.

Since 2015 she has had a number of feature-length film roles, including My Blind Date with Life, Sweethearts by Karoline Herfurth, the horror film Heilstätten, and David Dietl's Rate Your Date.

For her portrayal of Betty in Heilstätten, she won the 2019 Jupiter Award for Best Actress.

Filmography

Television 
 2006: Alle lieben Jimmy – RTL
 2007: Adem's Sohn – ARTE
 2009: Stolberg – Bei Anruf Mord – ZDF
 2009: Bella Block: Vorsehung – ZDF
 2009: Danni Lowinski – Selbstbestimmung – Sat.1
 2010: The Old Fox – Tödliche Ermittlung – ZDF
 2014: Die Briefe meiner Mutter – Das Erste
 2015: Tatort – Roomservice – Das Erste
 2015: Polizeiruf 110 – Grenzgänger – Das Erste
 2016: Mitten in Deutschland: NSU – Das Erste
 2013–2019: Leipzig Homicide – from episode 229 – ZDF

Feature-length films 
 2016: Allein gegen die Zeit – Der Film
 2017: Fette Kumpels
 2017: My Blind Date with Life
 2018: Heilstätten
 2018: Verpiss dich Schneewittchen
 2019: Rate Your Date
 2019: Sweethearts
 2020: Contra
2021: The Four of Us

Short films 
 2007: Stiller Frühling
 2007: Türk Rulet
 2008: Suzan
 2010: Tintenfischwolken
 2011: George 90°
 2012: Der Passagier

Commercials 
 2009: Telekom "Grenzen gab es gestern" ("Borders are the thing of the past")
 2012: Lebe Viva
 2018: Wix.com

Voice acting 
 2010: Berliner Morgenpost: Kinderkram
 2010: Upperdog – Rolle: Yanne
 2011: Royal Pains – Rolle: Anna
 2013: Quellen des Lebens – Rolle: Laura

Awards 
 2019: Jupiter Award – Best Actress for "Heilstätten" 
 2018: nominated for Young Icons Award – Actress/Actor for "My Blind Date with Life" 
 2020: Bavarian Film Awards – Best Actress for "Contra"

External links 

 
 Agent website for Nilam Farooq

References 

Actresses from Berlin
21st-century German actresses
1989 births
People from Wilmersdorf
German bloggers
German women bloggers
Living people
German people of Pakistani descent
German people of Polish descent